Neural Lab is a no-cost neural network simulator that designs and trains artificial neural networks for use in many fields such as engineering, business, computer science and technology. It integrates with Microsoft Visual Studio using C (Win32 - Wintempla) to incorporate artificial neural networks into custom applications, research simulations or end user interfaces.

It provides a visual environment to design and test artificial neural networks.

The latest Neural Lab version is 4.1.

The two major versions are version 3.1 and 4.0.

Version 3.x
Version 3.1 is navigated using a standard computer mouse. Version 3.1 is considered easier to use, however, it is difficult to perform complex tasks programmatically. Version 3.1 is therefore primarily useful for people without a programming background.

The version 3.1 tutorial provided minimal theoretical background on artificial neural networks. Despite the number of examples, most of the examples focus only on multi-layer networks with supervised training.

Version 4.x
In version 4.0, it is possible to perform neural network operations by writing code. The code is very similar to C/C++, Java or C#.

In version 4.0, the authors incorporate background information on artificial neural networks.

Version 4.0 incorporates Kohonen networks that can be trained without supervision and probabilistic neural networks.

Features
The tools allow reviewing and analyzing the structure of the training set. 
The activation of the neurons for each case in the data set are visible. The tutorial provides examples in prediction, data mapping, data classification and auto associative memory problems.
 Once a network has been trained, it is possible to save it to a file. The file can be opened using Microsoft Visual Studio to create a standalone application that can employ the network.

Applications
Specific examples of neural networks include:
 Prediction
 Mapping
 Auto Association
 Classification
 Network Simulation

Wintempla
Neural Lab is developed using Wintempla (a plug in that works with Microsoft Visual Studio). Wintempla encapsulates Win32 and simplifies the development of Microsoft Windows applications using C++ and native Win32 APIs.

Wintempla is a tool that integrates with Microsoft Visual Studio. Wintempla encapsulates Win32 to simplify the creation of Web and Desktop applications using C++ and object-oriented programming. The programmer has the option to use the native Win32 APIs or the Wintempla classes.

Wintempla includes:

File extensions
.lab Neural Lab code (a UNICODE text file)
.lay A multi-layer neural network file
.lax A complex-domain multi-layer neural network file
.koh A Kohonen neural network file
.prb A probabilistic neural network file
.csv A comma separated values file

See also
Artificial neural network
Neural network software
Generative Adversarial Network

References

External links

 Download Latest Version (Run on Microsoft Windows: Vista, 8, 8.1 or 10)

Neural network software